Beautiful (sometimes stylized as beautiful.) is the third studio album by Japanese musician Fantastic Plastic Machine. It was released on January 17, 2001 by Avex Trax, and peaked at number 38 on the Oricon Albums Chart. The album was released in the United States on May 15, 2001 by Emperor Norton Records.

Track listing

Charts

References

External links
 

2001 albums
Fantastic Plastic Machine (musician) albums
Avex Trax albums
Emperor Norton Records albums